Lester Smith (August 16, 1942 – March 14, 2019) was an American oil executive and philanthropist, active in Texas.

References 

1942 births
2019 deaths
20th-century American philanthropists